{{Infobox officeholder
| name           = Govind Narayan Singh
| image          = 
| caption        = 
| order          = 12th
| office         = Governor of Bihar
| 1blankname     = Chief Minister 
| 1namedata      = Bhagwat Jha Azad
| term_start     = 26 February 1988
| term_end       = 24 January 1989
| predecessor    = Pendekanti Venkatasubbaiah
| successor      = Dipak Kumar Sen 
| office1        = 5th Chief Minister of Madhya Pradesh
| term_start1    = 30 July 1967
| term_end1      = 12 March 1969
| predecessor1   = Dwarka Prasad Mishra
| successor1     = Raja Nareshchandra Singh
| birth_date     = 
| birth_place    = Rampur Baghelan, Central Provinces and Berar, British India
Govind Narayan Singh (25 July 1920 – 10 May 2005), was an Indian politician. He was Chief Minister of Madhya Pradesh from July 30, 1967 to March 12, 1969. He was also Governor of Bihar state from February 26, 1988 to January 24, 1989.

Political career

Singh was elected to the Vindhya Pradesh Vidhan Sabha in 1951 from Rampur-Baghelan constituency. Later, he was elected to the Madhya Pradesh Vidhan Sabha in 1957    and 1962.

He was Deputy Minister of Home Affairs and Deputy Minister of Public Works (Irrigation) from 27 May 1963. From September 30, 1963, to July 29, 1967, the Minister of Local Government in the Dwarka Prasad Mishra ministry.

In 1967, he was elected to the Madhya Pradesh Vidhan Sabha as an Indian National Congress candidate but soon rebelled against Dwarka Prasad Mishra and he resigned from the Congress party. He formed a new political party known as the Lok Sewak Dal and became the Chief Minister of Madhya Pradesh as the leader of a coalition, known as the Samyukta Vidhayak Dal. He was the chief minister of the state from 30 July 1967 to 12 March 1969. He returned to Indian National Congress.

He also served a term as the Governor of Bihar state from 26 February 1988 to 24 January 1989.

Personal life 

He was born to  Awadhesh Pratap Singh, the first chief minister of  Vindhya Pradesh   and Maharaj Kumari. He received his PhD from the Benaras Hindu University (BHU) in literature. He had five sons and one daughter. Of his sons, Harsh Singh is M.L.A. from Rampur-Baghelan constituency and Dhruv Narayan Singh was an M.L.A. from Bhopal Madhya (Vidhan Sabha constituency) to Madhya Pradesh Legislative Assembly. Dhruv Narayan gained notability in recent Shehla Masood murder case along with Zahida Parvez.

References

External links
 States of India Since 1947
 The Hindu Website news article

1920 births
2005 deaths
Indian National Congress politicians
Chief Ministers of Madhya Pradesh
Governors of Bihar
Vindhya Pradesh politicians
Vindhya Pradesh MLAs 1951–1956
Madhya Pradesh MLAs 1957–1962
Madhya Pradesh MLAs 1962–1967
Madhya Pradesh MLAs 1967–1972
People from Satna district